WABE-TV (channel 30) is a secondary PBS member television station in Atlanta, Georgia, United States. Owned by Atlanta Public Schools, it is a sister outlet to NPR member station WABE (90.1 FM) and local educational access cable service APS Cable Channel 22. The three outlets share studios on Bismark Road in the Morningside/Lenox Park section of Atlanta; WABE-TV's transmitter is located on New Street Northeast (south of DeKalb Avenue) in the city's Edgewood neighborhood.

WABE-TV was Georgia's first public television station, signing on as WETV in February 1958, and is the only one that is not part of Georgia Public Broadcasting (GPB). It has typically provided a programming mix more reflective of the city of Atlanta than the statewide service from GPB, though duplication between the two has been an issue at times in WABE-TV's history.

History
The Board of Education of the City of Atlanta filed on February 16, 1953, for a construction permit to build a new noncommercial educational television station on Atlanta's reserved channel 30. The Federal Communications Commission granted the application on March 21, 1956; the school board announced that the station would operate from the former Rock Springs School. After delays in tower construction set back the start, the station first signed on the air as WETV, for "Educational Television", on February 17, 1958; test broadcasts had started at the end of 1957.

Channel 30, the first educational television station to sign on in Georgia, focused initially on programs for use in the city's public schools. The initial offering consisted of five high school courses and two at the elementary school level. In addition, the station aired programs from National Educational Television and produced local specialty programming, including Board of Aldermen and Board of Education meetings and programs for senior citizens and Spanish speakers. In 1973, the station began broadcasting on Saturdays for the first time ever.

Parallel to WETV's early years, the University of Georgia built WGTV, channel 8 in Athens, in 1960, and the Georgia Educational Television Network was constructed in the 1960s, providing service to the rest of the state. However, in the early 1980s, when WGTV was amalgamated with Georgia Educational Television to form the present Georgia Public Broadcasting, Governor George Busbee called for the state to negotiate to purchase WETV. The late 1970s and early 1980s also saw other changes: the formation of a Public Broadcasting Association to advise on the operations of WETV and WABE; upset workers who threatened a wildcat strike over work schedule issues; and Fulton County's decision to stop funding WABE and WETV in 1982, which almost led the Atlanta school board to turn both over to GPB. Ultimately, the factor that dissuaded the Board of Education from handing over its broadcasting outlets was the fact that it was a minority school system and had no interest in turning over the services to a predominantly White group.

In 1984, seeking to improve its image, channel 30 changed its call letters to WPBA ("Public Broadcasting Atlanta"). The station periodically explored potential new directions, such as a 1991 study that suggested focusing on local productions and deemphasizing network shows; the same study also suggested a move to a multicultural format for WABE, which drew the ire of public broadcasting supporters. The advisory board campaigned in 1993 to take full control of the stations; this led to its restructuring as the Atlanta Educational Telecommunications Collaborative in 1994. After the handover, WPBA more than doubled its annual budget thanks to increased corporate and viewer donations, and its number of members tripled; however, much of this came from airing PBS programming, prompting more concern by some donors of overlap with GPB. The statewide network made another overture to take over WPBA and WABE, which the Atlanta Board of Education rebuffed, with the racial composition of channel 30's management compared to the state agency again being cited.

On September 6, 1999, WPBA assumed time-lease rights to Atlanta Public Schools's APS Cable channel (carried on Comcast channel 22 in metropolitan Atlanta), which began to air programming from the upstart PBS Kids Channel each night from 6:00 p.m. to 6:00 a.m., with instructional programming acquired by the school district continuing to air during the daytime hours.

In 2005, WPBA heavily reduced its PBS program offerings after Atlanta Public Schools and station management decided to make channel 30 a participant in the service's Program Differentiation Plan; this came amid frequent complaints of duplication between WPBA and GPB and a desire to cut costs at the station. As a result, the station began to carry only 25 percent of the programming broadcast by PBS's national feed, giving GPB primary status for most new PBS programs. To make up for the reduced lineup of PBS shows, WPBA also expanded its reliance on syndicated programs from American Public Television and other distributors as well as locally produced news and public affairs programs.

On July 23, 2018, WPBA discontinued the "PBA 30" branding, used since the late 1990s, and changed its moniker to "ATL PBA", removing references to its over-the-air virtual channel. The following day (July 24), Atlanta Public Schools reached an agreement with PBS to convert WPBA into a full-service member outlet in order to better compete with GPB for viewers, public and private monetary contributions, and corporate programming underwriters. The move, which allows WPBA to carry any content supplied by the service and to provide PBS Passport to its members, resulted in a roughly $500,000 increase in programming expenditures; however, the station announced that it would not simulcast programming with GPB and would inform the statewide network of its scheduling decisions. In addition, it was announced that the station planned to keep its Monday and Friday lineups—which primarily relied on British programming—unchanged and expand local program production.

On January 18, 2022, Public Broadcasting Atlanta rebranded both WPBA and its sister station WABE, along with their websites, podcasts and smartphone apps, as a single unified entity named WABE, with a new logo and slogan, "Amplifying Atlanta". The call sign of the television station changed to WABE-TV on that date.

Local programming
WABE-TV's local programming, fitting the station's remit, traditionally focuses on Atlanta issues and culture, though in recent years it has been more limited while WABE built out a digital presence and a series of podcasts. The weekly talk show Love and Respect with Killer Mike airs on television and expanded to radio in 2022; that same year, the station began a concert series franchise, Sounds Like ATL.

Technical information

Subchannels
The station's digital channel is multiplexed:

NHK World-Japan was added as a subchannel in 2018.

Analog-to-digital conversion
WPBA began transmitting a digital television signal on UHF channel 21 in 2000. WPBA shut down its analog signal, over UHF channel 30, on June 12, 2009, the official date in which full-power television in the United States transitioned from analog to digital broadcasts under federal mandate. The station's digital signal remained on its pre-transition UHF channel 21, virtual channel 30.

Transmission tower

WABE radio and television share two adjacent towers in the east side of the city between Edgewood and Kirkwood, with the single transmitter antenna used by local radio stations WSB-FM (98.5), WSTR (94.1 FM) and WVEE (103.3 FM). (The transmitters used by the three radio stations are diplexed together, so that they all feed to the antenna instead of into one another.) WABE-TV (as WPBA) formerly maintained transmitter facilities on Stone Mountain, but was forced to relocate as a result of WGTV needing the space for its digital equipment, in addition to maintaining its analog transmitter, along with the existing use of the tower by KEC80 to transmit NOAA Weather Radio broadcasts.

Like WGTV, WABE-TV also has a weak signal well below the maximum power allowed by the FCC, limiting its useful broadcast range. As a result, its over-the-air signal is marginal at best outside of the I-285 Perimeter (i.e., Atlanta itself and the inner suburbs).

References

External links
 
Stuart A. Rose Manuscript, Archives, and Rare Book Library, Emory University: The Southern Voice videotapes, 1984

PBS member stations
ABE-TV
Television channels and stations established in 1958
1958 establishments in Georgia (U.S. state)